Pariser schnitzel is a schnitzel variation from French cuisine. Unlike Wiener schnitzel, it does not incorporate bread crumbs. The name dates as far back as from the World Exhibition in Paris 1889.

Pariser schnitzel is prepared from a thin slice of veal, salted, which is dredged in flour and then dipped in beaten egg. Though not traditional, and providing slightly different results, many modernised recipes substitute vegetable oil, typically canola, for the butter or lard.

See also
 List of veal dishes

References

Veal dishes
French cuisine
Austrian cuisine